Qareh Gol-e Sofla (also Romanized as Qarah Gol-e Soflá; also known as Garagūā, Qareh Gol, and Qareh Golūl) is a village in Mishan Rural District, Mahvarmilani District, Mamasani County, Fars Province, Iran. At the 2006 census, its population was 45, in 10 families.

References 

Populated places in Mamasani County